The 2006–07 Toto Cup Al was the third edition under the current Toto Cup format. The final was played at Ramat Gan Stadium, Ramat Gan, on April 17, 2007.

The winners were Maccabi Herzliya, beating Hapoel Kfar Saba in the final 2–1 thanks to a goal in the game extra time by Omer Buchsenbaum.

Group stage
The matches were played from August 5, 2006 to February 28, 2007.

Group A

Group B

Semifinals

Final

See also
 Toto Cup
 2006–07 Israeli Premier League
 2006–07 in Israeli football

External links
 Official website 

Al
Toto Cup Al
Israel Toto Cup Al